Gabriel Siminic (born 11 March 1986) is a Romanian footballer. He plays as a left back for Crișul Chișineu-Criș.

Career

Oțelul Galați
Siminic signed for Oțelul in July 2009, and after only one year he agreed a mutual departure with the club in June 2010.

CSMS Iași
Siminic joined CSMS Iași in the Summer of 2010.

References

External links

1986 births
Living people
Romanian footballers
Association football defenders
Liga I players
Liga II players
FC Politehnica Timișoara players
CSM Reșița players
FC Gloria Buzău players
ASC Oțelul Galați players
FC Politehnica Iași (2010) players
FC UTA Arad players
CS Șoimii Pâncota players
CS Național Sebiș players
CS Crișul Chișineu-Criș players
CSC Dumbrăvița players
Sportspeople from Reșița